Ahsan Siddique Malik  (Born 3 November 1948) is a retired Pakistan Army officer who defended Kamalpur in the Indo-Pakistani War of 1971. He held the rank of Captain at the time, serving in the 31st Battalion, Baloch Regiment.

Defence of Kamalpur 

Mukti Bahini, the Bangladesh liberation army, consisting of Bangla speaking foot soldiers supported by discriminated Bangla speaking Pakistani soldiers, took on the Pakistani artillery stationed at the Kamalpur garrison. Small children and elderly women were kidnapped. Bengali liberation forces carried out more attacks on Kamalpur, a kilometer from the border, on 22 October and 14 November, the latter being partly supported by the Indian Army's 13th Battalion, Brigade of the Guards (of Kler's brigade), which established blocking positions to the south. Malik was cut off and his CO, Lt. Col. Sultan Ahmed tried to extract him and reassert control of two other outposts, Naqshi and Baromari without success. On 29 November Major Ayub of 31 Baloch attempted to resupply Malik's tiny garrison but failed.

Kler tried to take Kamalpur on the run, using Mukti Bahini troops and failed. He then mounted an attack by the 1st Battalion, Maratha Light Infantry on the forty men and four 120 mm mortars of 83 Mortar Battery and overran them, suffering one casualty. Kler then 'decided to lay siege to Kamalpur and break down its will to resist', according to General Sukhwant Singh. Getting wary because of casualties, successive failures and demoralization among the attacking troops, he decided to starve out the garrison by a prolonged siege. Singh knew that there was no Pakistani artillery in this sector, only two troops of mortars, but states that Kler was '...further handicapped inasmuch as one of his battalions had just been reorganized from (a unit) raised initially for counterinsurgency with no support elements. In tackling a weak platoon post, another battalion brought out some weaknesses of leadership under fire. The battalion reached its objective with relatively few casualties. As expected, the enemy turned mortar fire on the objective. A mortar bomb landed on the trench occupied by four men close to the commanding officer (Colonel). He saw limbs fly and lost his nerve.'

At about 0930 on 4 December, after withdrawing his troops from close siege, Kler 'hammered the post with seven sorties of MiG-21s firing rockets and cannon and this was repeated twice later in the day'. Major General Gurbux Singh (commander of the north region) himself entered affairs by sending Capt. Malik a note via a Mukti Bahini courier: '...whatever you decide to do we have every intention of eliminating Kamalpur post. It is to save you and our side casualties this message is being sent to you …' He sent another note after a further air strike and this was met, as had been the other messages, by increased firing by Malik's men. But it could not go on, Malik received the order by radio to surrender, which he did at 1900 that day.

Sukhwant Singh stated, 'He had put up a courageous stand … and surrendered after holding a brigade of besiegers for 21 days … Sam Manekshaw sent a personal congratulatory message to Malik commending his defiant stand.' and wrote 'Militarily his performance was excellent'.

Maj. Gen. Gurbux Singh decided to meet Malik personally but, while being driven towards Kamalpur by Kler, their jeep went over a mine, and he was badly wounded.

When Capt. Malik's force was taken in, it was found that his company was nearly out of ammunition, barring a few hand grenades and a few bullets each. They were ready to fling themselves on the enemy with daggers and bayonets if it came to that, until they realised that the piece of territory they were defending was already a different country.

When he returned to Pakistan, he was decorated with a Sitara-e-Jurrat which is the third highest military award in Pakistan. Later on, Field Marshal Sam Manekshaw, Chief of Army Staff of the Indian Army at the time, acknowledged the bravery of Malik's men in a letter written to his Pakistani counterpart. He even wrote a personal letter to Malik.

Awards and decorations

See also 
 Last Stand
 Defence of Kamalpur

References 

 

Baloch Regiment officers
1948 births
Living people